In Brazil, the governors are the chief executives of the states of Brazil. The list below contains are the elected governors for the 2023-2027 term.

Map

Current governors

References 

Brazil